Minagawa is a Japanese surname. Notable people with the surname include:

, Japanese sport wrestler
, Japanese writer
, Japanese video game artist, designer and director
, Japanese voice actress
, Japanese rhythmic gymnast
, Japanese alpine skier
, Japanese manga artist
, retired Japanese professional baseball pitcher
, Japanese international football player

Japanese-language surnames